Vyacheslav Vladimirovich Ponomarev (born 2 May 1965, in Sloviansk) is an owner of a soap production company who in 2014 became known as the self-proclaimed mayor of the city of Sloviansk in Donetsk Oblast, a part of Ukraine.

Origin
The origin of Vyacheslav Ponomaryov is uncertain. According to the official legend that is promoted by Pravda.ru, Ponomaryov, a Sloviansk native, was an owner of a sawing factory and later a soap producing factory.

Instigation of pro-Russian insurgency
He declared himself mayor after leading an assault on the Sloviansk mayor's office on 14 April 2014, as part of the 2014 pro-Russian conflict in Ukraine. Ponamarev is a strong opponent of the government of Ukraine that formed in Kiev after the 2014 Ukrainian revolution, and refers to it as fascist. He claims that coalition government in Kiev is run by "Nazis" and "homosexuals". Ponomaryov stated that he would do everything he could to prevent the 2014 Ukrainian presidential election taking place.

Ponomarev has said that he commands around 2,500 men in the vicinity of Sloviansk. He is a veteran of the Soviet–Afghan War and served in a "special operations unit" of the Arctic-based Northern Fleet. His men held the elected mayor of Sloviansk, Nelya Shtepa, in captivity, though Ponomarev said that his government was protecting her from Ukrainian law enforcement. He also stated that there was conflict between him and Shtepa, in which she acted "incorrectly". In an interview to Gazeta.ru, Ponomaryov said that she was given protection after the Security Service of Ukraine opened a case against her for separatism.

On direction of Ponomarev, his men detained American Vice News journalist Simon Ostrovsky on 20 April, who declared after his release that he had been intimidated and beaten during his detention. According to the journalist, Ponomaryov's men had his photo and were looking for him. According to Ponomaryov, Ostrovsky has dual citizenship and is a spy. In an interview to Gazeta.ru on 23 April, Ponomaryov acknowledged that he had kept Ostrovsky for exchange. Ostrovsky was released only after the intervention of representatives from OSCE and the United States Department of State. Ponomaryov told the media that Ostrovsky was not a hostage, but a guest, and that he simply accommodated Ostrovsky with lodging.

According to the Security Service of Ukraine, on 20 April 2014 Ponomaryov received orders from Igor Girkin to dispose of the body of local representative of Horlivka city council Volodymyr Rybak, who had been kidnapped and tortured to death.

On 25 April 2014, a vehicle with OSCE representatives was stopped and the observers  detained by Ponomarev's forces. 

Later Ponomaryov declared that kidnapping of people is a retaliation for all his detained "comrades".

On 10 June 2014, Ponomarev was arrested and taken to the headquarters of the Donbass People's Militia in a former SBU building. Volodymyr Pavlenko was appointed a mayor of Slovyansk instead of Ponomaryov. Along with the withdrawing pro-Russian militia, Ponomaryov left Slovyansk on 5 July 2014.

References

1965 births
People from Sloviansk
Soviet military personnel of the Soviet–Afghan War
Pro-Russian people of the 2014 pro-Russian unrest in Ukraine
People of the Donetsk People's Republic
Russian nationalists
Russian criminals
Pro-Russian people of the war in Donbas
Russian individuals subject to European Union sanctions
Living people
Ukrainian collaborators with Russia
Anti-Ukrainian sentiment in Ukraine